Cavet is a surname. Notable people with the surname include:

 Benjamin Cavet (born 1994), English-born French skier
 Tillar H. Cavet (1889–1966), American baseball player

See also
 Avet
 Cavett
 Cavit